The 1974 Eastern Suburbs season was the 68th in the club's history. They competed in the NSWRFL's 1974 premiership, finishing the regular season as minor premiers. They went on to play in and win the grand final. Easts also competed in the 1974 Amco Cup.

Player line-up
 Ian Baker
 Greg Bandiera
 Arthur Beetson
 John Brass
 Harry Cameron
 Ron Coote 
 John Dykes
 Russell Fairfax
 Eric Ferguson
 Laurie Freier
 Mark Harris
 Les Hayes
 Kel Jones
 Pat Kelly
 Doug Lucas
 Ian Mackay
 Johnny Mayes
 Arthur Mountier
 Bill Mullins
 Greg McCarthy
 Graham Olling
 John Peard
 Bruce Pickett
 Jim Porter 
 Barry Reilly
 Mick Souter
 Kevin Stevens
 Terry Stevens
 Ray Strudwick
 Elwyn Walters

1974 Premiership
Results;

 Round 1, Eastern Suburbs 31(7 Tries; 5 Goals) defeated Penrith 6(2 Tries)
 Round 2, Eastern Suburbs 44(10 Tries; 7 Goals) defeated Cronulla Sutherland 13(3 Tries; 2 Goals)

1974 Pre-Season Cup

Wills Pre-season Cup Results;
 Final, Eastern Suburbs 43(Pat Kelly 3, Harris 2, Mullins 2, Walters, Bruce Pickett Tries; Brass 8 Goals) defeated South Sydney 0

Season Highlights
 Eastern Suburbs won their 10th Premiership, their first in 29 years, defeating Canterbury Bankstown  19-4 in the decider.
 Eastern Suburbs won the Minor Premiership.
 Eastern Suburbs won the Club Championship.
 Eastern Suburbs won the Pre-Season Cup defeating South Sydney 43-0 in the final.

References

 The Story Of Australian Rugby League, Gary Lester

Sydney Roosters seasons
Eastern Suburbs season
Eastern Suburbs season